Eveline Bodenmüller (born 30 September 1985) is a Swiss equestrian. She competed in the 2020 Summer Olympics.

References

1985 births
Living people
Sportspeople from Zürich
Equestrians at the 2020 Summer Olympics
Swiss female equestrians
Olympic equestrians of Switzerland
Event riders